Charlotte Moffett Cartwright (21 December 1842– 20 July 1915), born Charlotte Ann Terwilliger, was an Oregon pioneer at age 3, in the year 1845. Her father, James Terwilliger, brought the family to Oregon in that year, as part of the ill-fated Meek Cutoff party. Her mother died shortly after reaching The Dalles. She was brought up in the first house ever in Portland. This was built by her father.

She was known for her role in the women's suffrage movement, with the Oregon Pioneer Association, and as "Mother Moffett" as a caretaker of orphans. She also arranged and funded a circulating library in Oregon.

Personal
She was married twice, first to Walter Moffatt who died at sea and then Mr C.M. Cartwright. With her first husband she had five children.

References 

Oregon pioneers
1842 births
1915 deaths